Counseling psychology is a psychological specialty that began with a focus on vocational counseling, but later moved it's emphasis to adjustment counseling, and then expanded to cover all normal psychology psychotherapy.

The Society for Counseling Psychology in the United States says:Counseling Psychology is a generalist health service (HSP) specialty in professional psychology that uses a broad range of culturally informed and culturally sensitive practices to help people improve their well-being, prevent and alleviate distress and maladjustment, resolve crises, and increase their ability to function better in their lives. It focuses specifically but not exclusively on normative life-span development, with a particular emphasis on prevention and education as well as amelioration, addressing individuals as well as the systems or contexts in which they function. It has particular expertise in work and career issues.

History

Before the end of World War II 
Before World War II, qualified psychologists typically pursued science, rather than the direct treatment of patients. This task was the domain of psychiatrists who had both a medical degree and psychological training.

In 1896, the first psychological patient clinic was opened at the University of Pennsylvania by psychologist Lightner Witmer. He coined the term clinical psychology to describe his work. In the first half of the 20th century, clinical psychology focused on children's psychological assessment, with little attention given to treatment or adults.

The Vocation Bureau was established in Boston in 1908 by Frank Parsons. Parsons coined the term vocational guidance that year, and the Bureau soon became the concept's national body. The Bureau supported the work of vocational counselors, and successfully advocated for a large number of them to be appointed by Boston schools. Parson's influential book Choosing a Vocation was published in 1909. The Boston YMCA offered the first vocational guidance training.

Building on the work of the Bureau, the National Vocational Guidance Association (NVGA) was founded in 1913.

The National Social Workers' Exchange began in 1917, and in 1921 expanded it's scope and became the American Association of Social Workers.

Abraham and Hannah Stone began a marriage consultation centre in New York in 1929. The American Institute for Family Relations (AIFR) was established by Paul Popenoe in Los Angles in 1930. Emily Mudd founded the Marriage Council of Philadelphia in 1932. This kind of organisation was first found in Germany, and had grown through parts of Europe.

During World War II, the term counseling was used by American psychologist Carl Rogers to describe therapy provided by psychologists. In 1942, Rogers published the book Counseling and Psychotherapy. In that book's introduction he said the terms "counselling" and "psychotherapy" were equivalents, the main difference being that different professions tended to use one term or the other. He noted that people who did this work might call themselves "a psychologist, a college counselor, a marital adviser, a psychiatrist, a social worker, a high-school guidance counselor, an industrial personnel worker, or [use] some other name."

1942 also saw the establishment of the American Association of Marriage Counselors (AAMC). The Stones and Mudd took part in this.

A great adjustment 
The end of World War II in 1945 saw many combatants return home. Over 3.2 million American veterans applied for training under the GI Bill, creating a strong need for vocational and personal adjustment counseling at the US Veterans Administration (VA). That year, Rogers was invited to set up a counseling center at the University of Chicago.

It was also at this time that clinical psychologists began offering therapy to adults in large numbers, with many employed by the VA.

The end of the war also saw the American Psychological Association establish Divisions, providing interest groups for it's members to join. Divisions 11 and 12 of were formed in 1945, with the two merging in 1946 to become the "Division of Clinical and Abnormal Psychology" (as Division 12).

Division 17 of the APA was formed in 1946 as the "Division of Personnel and Guidance Psychologists".

Also in 1946, Connecticut became the first US state to require psychologists to be licenced. The last to do so was Missouri in 1977.

In 1947, Rogers was elected president of the APA.

The Marriage Council of Philadelphia started the first US marriage counsellor training program in 1948, training Navy chaplains.

It was suggested that "personal adjustment counseling is actually a psychotherapeutic supplement to vocational counseling for problems not serious enough to require psychiatric treatments," in 1949.

More than 500 people had joined Division 17 in 1949. Around half of these provided guidance (or supervised it) in an educational setting. Approximately 20% guided people in the VA. 40% of Division 17 members were also members of the NVGA.

Counseling psychology and other counseling 
In 1951, the APA's Division 17 became the "Division for Counseling Psychology". This body united psychologists, students and professionals who were dedicated to promote education and training, practice, scientific investigation, diversity and public interest in the field of counseling psychology. (It would later become known as the "Society for Counseling Psychology").

In 1952 the American Personnel and Guidance Association (APGA) was founded, merging together the NVGA, the National Association of Guidance and Counselor Trainers (NAGCT), the Student Personnel Association for Teacher Education (SPATE), and the American College Personnel Association (ACPA).

Starting in the early 1950's, the first counseling psychology PhD programs were at the University of Minnesota; Ohio State University; University of Maryland, College Park; University of Missouri; Teachers College, Columbia University; and University of Texas at Austin.

At times, counseling psychologists with qualifications from university education departments had difficulty being registered as psychologists by US states, due to difficulty proving that their study was sufficiently psychological in nature.

In 1955, the National Association of Social Workers was established through the consolidation of seven groups including the American Association of Social Workers and the National Association of School Social Workers.

In 1960, the AIFR in Los Angeles was described "the world's largest and best known marriage-counseling center," with a staff of seventy. By that year, the institute had given training to over 300 marriage counselors and shorter courses around the US to over 1500 other people.

The US National Association of School Psychologists (NASP) began in 1969.

The AAMC became the American Association for Marriage and Family Therapy (AAMFT) in 1974.

In 1976, the American Mental Health Counselors Association (AMHCA) was founded to represent mental health councelors who didn't qualify for APA membership, and didn't fit in the college counseling focused APGA. The AMHCA became a part of the latter in 1978.

Individual US states began to licence counselors in the 1970s. In 1981, the APGA established The Council for Accreditation of Counseling and Related Educational Programs to standardise counseling education. In 1982, the APGA established an independent body, the National Board for Certified Counselors (NBCC), to provide a national certification system for counselors who were not qualified psychologists.

The APGA changed it's name in 1983 to the "American Association of Counseling and Development" (AACD), and then in 1992 to the "American Counseling Association" (ACA). (Also in 1992, the ACPA left the organisation.)

The AIFR ceased operating in the 1980s.

A 1986 study found that of APA Division 17 members, 80% did personal adjustment counseling, 71% did vocational counceling, 69% did long-term psychotherapy and 58% did family counceling. It found that "there appear to be few, if any, empirical bases on which to distinguish counseling psychologists from their colleagues in clinical psychology."

In the late 1980s and 1990s, US states increasingly required the licencing of family councilors. The Association of Marital & Family Therapy Regulatory Boards was established to allow for nationally harmonised accreditation.

As much as their practitioners did many of the same things, clinical psychology came to focus on treating abnormal psychology issues, while counseling psychology came to focus on addressing normal psychology matters.

Counseling, as overseen by the ACA, came to include all the subject areas listed by Rogers in 1942 that didn't require it's practitioners to have psychology or psychiatry qualifications, including those that use "some other name". However, while it had Divisions for family counseling and social work, other bodies would have many more members from those fields.

Many US states now require people describing themselves as counselors to be licensed by the NBCC, such counselors becoming a National Certified Counselor.

Books describing the present international state of the field include the Handbook of Counseling and Psychotherapy in an International Context; the International Handbook of Cross-Cultural Counseling; and Counseling Around the World: An International Handbook. Taken together these volumes trace the global history of the field, explore divergent philosophical assumptions, counseling theories, processes, and trends in different countries, and review a variety of global counselor education programs. Moreover, traditional and indigenous treatment and healing methods that may predate modern counseling methods by hundreds of years remain of significance in many non-Western and Western countries.

Employment and salary
Counseling psychologists are employed in a variety of settings depending on the services they provide and the client populations they serve. Some are employed in colleges and universities as teachers, supervisors, researchers, and service providers. Others are employed in independent practice providing counseling, psychotherapy, assessment, and consultation services to individuals, couples/families, groups, and organizations. Additional settings in which counseling psychologists practice include community mental health centers, Veterans Administration medical centers and other facilities, family services, health maintenance organizations, rehabilitation agencies, business and industrial organizations and consulting within firms.

The amount of training required for psychologists differs based on the country in which they are practicing. Typically, a psychologist completes an undergraduate degree followed by 5–6 years of further study and/or training, leading to the Ph.D.

In 2022, the median salary for counseling psychologists in the United States was $86,938.

Process and outcome
Counseling psychologists are interested in answering a variety of research questions about counseling process and outcome. Counseling process refers to how or why counseling happens and progresses. Counseling outcome addresses whether or not counseling is effective, under what conditions it is effective, and what outcomes are considered effective—such as symptom reduction, behavior change, or quality of life improvement. Topics commonly explored in the study of counseling process and outcome include therapist variables, client variables, the counseling or therapeutic relationship, cultural variables, process and outcome measurement, mechanisms of change, and process and outcome research methods. Classic approaches appeared early in the US in the field of humanistic psychology by Carl Rogers who identified the mission of counseling interview as "to permit deeper expression that the client would ordinarily allow himself"

Therapist variables
Therapist variables include characteristics of a counselor or psychotherapist, as well as therapist technique, behavior, theoretical orientation and training. In terms of therapist behavior, technique and theoretical orientation, research on adherence to therapy models has found that adherence to a particular model of therapy can be helpful, detrimental, or neutral in terms of impact on outcome.

A recent meta-analysis of research on training and experience suggests that experience level is only slightly related to accuracy in clinical judgment. Higher therapist experience has been found to be related to less anxiety, but also less focus. This suggests that there is still work to be done in terms of training clinicians and measuring successful training.

Client variables
Client characteristics such as help-seeking attitudes and attachment style have been found to be related to client use of counseling, as well as expectations and outcome. Stigma against mental illness can keep people from acknowledging problems and seeking help. Public stigma has been found to be related to self-stigma, attitudes towards counseling, and willingness to seek help.

In terms of attachment style, clients with avoidance styles have been found to perceive greater risks and fewer benefits to counseling, and are less likely to seek professional help, than securely attached clients. Those with anxious attachment styles perceive greater benefits as well as risks to counseling. Educating clients about expectations of counseling can improve client satisfaction, treatment duration and outcomes, and is an efficient and cost-effective intervention.

Counseling relationship

The relationship between a counselor and client is the feelings and attitudes that a client and therapist have towards one another, and the manner in which those feelings and attitudes are expressed. Some theorists have suggested that the relationship may be thought of in three parts: transference and countertransference, working alliance, and the real—or personal—relationship. Other theorists argue that the concepts of transference and countertransference are outdated and inadequate.

Transference can be described as the client's distorted perceptions of the therapist. This can have a great effect on the therapeutic relationship. For instance, the therapist may have a facial feature that reminds the client of their parent. Because of this association, if the client has significant negative or positive feelings toward their parent, they may project these feelings onto the therapist. This can affect the therapeutic relationship in a few ways. For example, if the client has a very strong bond with their parent, they may see the therapist as a father or mother figure and have a strong connection with the therapist. This can be problematic because as a therapist, it is not ethical to have a more than "professional" relationship with a client. It can also be a good thing, because the client may open up greatly to the therapist. In another way, if the client has a very negative relationship with their parent, the client may feel negative feelings toward the therapist. This can then affect the therapeutic relationship as well. For example, the client may have trouble opening up to the therapist because he or she lacks trust in their parent (projecting these feelings of distrust onto the therapist).

Another theory about the function of the counseling relationship is known as the secure-base hypothesis, which is related to attachment theory. This hypothesis proposes that the counselor acts as a secure base from which clients can explore and then check in with. Secure attachment to one's counselor and secure attachment in general have been found to be related to client exploration. Insecure attachment styles have been found to be related to less session depth than securely attached clients.

Cultural variables
Counseling psychologists are interested in how culture relates to help-seeking and counseling process and outcome. Standard surveys exploring the nature of counselling across cultures and various ethnic groups include Counseling Across Cultures by Paul B. Pedersen, Juris G. Draguns, Walter J. Lonner and Joseph E. Trimble, Handbook of Multicultural Counseling by Joseph G. Ponterotto, J. Manueal Casas, Lisa A. Suzuki and Charlene M. Alexander and Handbook of Culture, Therapy, and Healing by Uwe P. Gielen, Jefferson M. Fish and Juris G. Draguns. Janet E. Helms' racial identity model can be useful for understanding how the relationship and counseling process might be affected by the client's and counselor's racial identity. Recent research suggests that clients who are Black are at risk for experiencing racial micro-aggression from counselors who are White.

Efficacy for working with clients who are lesbians, gay men, or bisexual might be related to therapist demographics, gender, sexual identity development, sexual orientation, and professional experience. Clients who have multiple oppressed identities might be especially at-risk for experiencing unhelpful situations with counselors, so counselors might need help with gaining expertise for working with clients who are transgender, lesbian, gay, bisexual, or transgender people of color, and other oppressed populations.

Gender role socialization can also present issues for clients and counselors. Implications for practice include being aware of stereotypes and biases about male and female identity, roles and behavior such as emotional expression. The APA guidelines for multicultural competence outline expectations for taking culture into account in practice and research.

Counseling ethics and regulation

Perceptions on ethical behaviors vary depending upon geographical location, but ethical mandates are similar throughout the global community. Ethical standards are created to help practitioners, clients and the community avoid any possible harm or potential for harm. The standard ethical behaviors are centered on "doing no harm" and preventing harm. An excellent guideline to follow is the Ethics Principles of Psychologists and Code of Conduct. This code lists out the expectations psychologists must meet and thoroughly clarifies portions of the code. Some examples from the code would be respecting clients' rights, ensuring proper professional competence, ensuring the client's welfare, and giving informed consent to name a few items from the code. Several states require counselors to follow a specific Code of Ethics which was revised and updated in 2014. Failure to follow this code can lead to license revocation or more severe consequences. One of the major reason for the Code of Conduct is to better protect and serve the client and the counselor.

Counselors must review with their clients verbally and in writing the responsibilities and rights that the counselor and client have. On top of this, counselors must explain the purpose, goals, techniques, procedures, limitations, potential risks, benefits of service: the counselor's qualifications, credentials, relevant experience, approach to counseling; continuation of service upon the death of counselor; the role of technology; and other pertinent information.

Counselors cannot share any confidential information that is obtained through the counseling process without specific written consent by the client or legal guardian except to prevent clear, imminent danger to the client or others, or when required to do so by a court order. Insurance companies or government programs will also be notified of certain information about your diagnosis and treatment to determine if your care is covered. Those companies and government programs are bound by HIPAA to keep that information strictly confidential.

Counselors are held to a higher standard than most professionals because of the intimacy of their therapeutic delivery. Counselors are not only to avoid fraternizing with their clients. They should avoid dual relationships, and never engage in sexual relationships. While explicit/detrimental relationships must be avoided, the counselor should understand what is currently going on and how their patient is reacting. While explicit/detrimental relationships must be avoided, the counselor should understand what is currently going on and how their patient reacts to the counseling sessions. Counselors are also prohibited from counseling their friends and family members to ensure they remain objective. They are also prohibited from engaging in an online relationship, such as a relationship over social media with a client.

The National Board for Certified Counselors states that counselors "shall discuss important considerations to avoid exploitation before entering into a non-counseling relationship with a former client. Important considerations to be discussed include amount of time since counseling service termination, duration of counseling, nature and circumstances of client's counseling, the likelihood that the client will want to resume counseling at some time in the future; circumstances of service termination and possible negative effects or outcomes."

Counselors walk a fine line in regards to gifts. Counselors are generally discouraged from accepting gifts, favors, or trade for therapy. While the idea of a gift seems innocent to others, it can have long-lasting consequences for a counselor. In some communities, it may be avoidable given the economic standing of that community. However, individuals may feel personally rejected. In some cases if an offering is something such as a "cookie" or some form of small token gesture like a drawing from a child, it may be acceptable to receive the gesture. As counselors, a judgment call must be made, but in most cases, avoiding gifts, favors, and trade can be maintained.

There are specific examinations all counselors must pass to practice their craft successfully. These examinations are the National Counselor Examination (NCE), National Clinical Mental Health Counselor Examination (NCMHCE), Certified Rehabilitation Counselor Examination (CRCE), Examination of Clinical Counselor Practice (ECCP). Of the exams listed, certain ones must be passed in certain specialties; however, the most common exam utilized is the NCE.

Outcome measurement
Counseling outcome measures might look at a general overview of symptoms, symptoms of specific disorders, or positive outcomes, such as subjective well-being or quality of life. The Outcome Questionnaire-45 is a 45-item self-report measure of psychological distress. An example of disorder-specific measure is the Beck Depression Inventory. The Quality of Life Inventory is a 17-item self-report life satisfaction measure.

Process and outcome research methods
Research about the counseling process and outcome uses a variety of research methodologies to answer questions about if, how, and why counseling works. Quantitative methods include randomly controlled clinical trials, correlation studies over the course of counseling, or laboratory studies about specific counseling process and outcome variables. Qualitative research methods can involve conducting, transcribing and coding interviews; transcribing and/or coding therapy sessions; or fine-grain analysis of single counseling sessions or counseling cases.

Training and supervision

Professional training process
Counseling psychologists are trained in graduate programs. Almost all programs grant a PhD, but a few grant a Psy.D. or Ed.D. Most doctoral programs take 5–6 years to complete. Graduate work in counseling psychology includes coursework in general psychology and statistics, counseling practice, and research. Students must complete an original dissertation at the end of their graduate training. Students must also complete a one-year full-time internship at an accredited site before earning their doctorate. In order to be licensed to practice, counseling psychologists must gain clinical experience under supervision, and pass a standardized exam.

Australia
In Australia, counseling psychology programs are accredited by the Australian Psychology Accreditation Council (APAC). To become registered as a counseling psychologist, one must meet the criteria for the area of practice endorsement. This includes an undergraduate degree in the science of psychology, an honours degree or a Graduate Diploma of Psychology, and a Master's or Doctorate degree in counseling psychology. Graduates must then complete a registrar program to obtain an area of practice endorsement and use the title counseling psychologist. A substantial component of this master's degree is dedicated to individual psychotherapy, family and couples therapy, group therapy, developmental theory and psychopathology.

Training models and research
Counseling psychology includes the study and practice of counselor training and counselor supervision. As researchers, counseling psychologists may investigate what makes training and supervision effective. As practitioners, counseling psychologists may supervise and train a variety of clinicians. Counselor training tends to occur in formal classes and training programs. Part of counselor training may involve counseling clients under the supervision of a licensed clinician. Supervision can also occur between licensed clinicians, as a way to improve clinicians' quality of work and competence with various types of counseling clients.

As the field of counseling psychology formed in the mid-20th century, initial training models included Robert Carkuff's human relations training model, Norman Kagan's Interpersonal Process Recall, and Allen Ivey's microcounseling skills. Modern training models include Gerard Egan's skilled helper model, and Clara E. Hill's three-stage model (exploration, insight, and action). A recent analysis of studies on counselor training found that modeling, instruction, and feedback are common to most training models, and seem to have medium to large effects on trainees.

Supervision models and research
Like the models of how clients and therapists interact, there are also models of the interactions between therapists and their supervisors. Edward S. Bordin proposed a model of supervision working alliance similar to his model of therapeutic working alliance. The Integrated Development Model considers the level of a client's motivation/anxiety, autonomy, and self and other awareness. The Systems Approach to Supervision views the relationship between supervisor and supervised as most important, in addition to characteristics of the supervisor's personal characteristics, counseling clients, training setting, as well as the tasks and functions of supervision. The Critical Events in Supervision model focuses on important moments that occur between the supervisor and supervised.

Problems can arise in supervision and training. Questions have arisen as far as a supervisor's need for formal training to be a competent supervisor. Recent research suggests that conflicting, multiple relationships can occur between supervisors and clients, such as that of the client, instructor, and clinical supervisor. The occurrence of racial micro-aggression against Black clients suggests potential problems with racial bias in supervision. In general, conflicts between a counselor and his or her own supervisor can arise when supervisors demonstrate disrespect, lack of support, and blaming.

Vocational development and career counseling

Vocational theories

There are several types of theories of vocational choice and development. These types include trait and factor theories, social cognitive theories, and developmental theories. Two examples of trait and factor theories, also known as person–environment fit, are Holland's theory and the Theory of Work Adjustment.

John Holland hypothesized six vocational personality/interest types and six work environment types: realistic, investigative, artistic, social, enterprising, and conventional. When a person's vocational interests match his or her work environment types, this is considered congruence. Congruence has been found to predict occupation and college major.

The Theory of Work Adjustment (TWA), as developed by René Dawis and Lloyd Lofquist, hypothesizes that the correspondence between a worker's needs and the reinforced systems predicts job satisfaction, and that the correspondence between a worker's skills and a job's skill requirements predicts job satisfaction. Job satisfaction and personal satisfaction together should determine how long one remains at a job. When there is a discrepancy between a worker's needs or skills and the job's needs or skills, then change needs to occur either in the worker or the job environment.

Social Cognitive Career Theory (SCCT) has been proposed by Robert D. Lent, Steven D. Brown and Gail Hackett. The theory takes Albert Bandura's work on self-efficacy and expands it to interest development, choice making, and performance. Person variables in SCCT include self-efficacy beliefs, outcome expectations and personal goals. The model also includes demographics, ability, values, and environment. Efficacy and outcome expectations are theorized to interrelate and influence interest development, which in turn influences choice of goals, and then actions. Environmental supports and barriers also affect goals and actions. Actions lead to performance and choice stability over time.

Career development theories propose vocational models that include changes throughout the lifespan. Donald Super's model proposes a lifelong five-stage career development process. The stages are growth, exploration, establishment, maintenance, and disengagement. Throughout life, people have many roles that may differ in terms of importance and meaning. Super also theorized that career development is an implementation of self-concept. Linda Gottfredson also proposed a cognitive career decision-making process that develops through the lifespan.  The initial stage of career development is hypothesized to be the development of self-image in childhood, as the range of possible roles narrows using criteria such as sex-type, social class, and prestige. During and after adolescence, people take abstract concepts into consideration, such as interests.

Career counseling 

The goal of Career Counseling is to help provide guidance during all stages of a person's career trajectory. Career Counseling looks to help an individual understand themselves and the ongoing world around them  so they may make an informed  decision regarding their life and career. Career counselors provide a wide array of services, such as attempting to help individuals discover themselves. Counselors also attempt to help others discover their actual goals or achievements they may want to complete in life regarding education, career, or their life in general.  While also helping individuals figure out what they may want to become, career counselors also help find resources and information that may be of use to people in achieving their future goals. Career counselors will create a roadmap of sorts to help individuals visualize where they are along in their journey of achieving their dreams. One factor that counselors deal with is people tend to think unemployment can be permanent; however, counselors must make sure that unemployment is only temporary and their status will eventually change. So counselors must do their best to give positive reinforcement to focus more on finding their path in life. Career counseling may include provision of occupational information, modeling skills, written exercises, and exploration of career goals and plans. Career counseling can also involve the use of personality or career interest assessments, such as the Myers-Briggs Type Indicator, which is based on Carl Jung's theory of psychological type, or the Strong Interest Inventory, which makes use of Holland's theory. Assessments of skills, abilities, and values are also commonly assessed in career counseling. Career counselors have the flexibility to decide whether to conduct sessions using a group setting or single face-to-face in person or online setting. Currently, there is no internationally accepted standard to become a qualified career counselor; qualifications and certification will vary depending on local, state, and internal regulations.

Effects of COVID in relation to counseling 
The ongoing pandemic has caused career counselors to adjust many of their current plans with their clients. While also helping to improve their abilities by facing new and different situations. The pandemic, in the beginning, caused a significant job layoff, which messed up a lot of people's career plans. Towards the beginning of 2020, employment lost around 22.4 million individuals, a downturn of around 15%. Another critical factor regarding the pandemic is that many schools shut down for a while, negatively impacting students. One such scenario is students looking for specific programs to start their masters may not have been able to with the educational shut down, which could have negatively impacted their future career path. After education started to come back online, counselors soon ran into an issue. They had to become more tech-savvy and understand how to work digitally significantly faster to help clients since the shift to an online platform. While moving to a more online counseling presence can be tricky, it will lead to more positives overall. One major positive being the flexibility with obtaining the counseling has become significantly better. However, while moving a portion to online telehealth, there are still cases that are better suited to in-person like addictions. There was an almost doubling of referrals regarding seeing a psychologist around 2020, 62%. When looking at psychologists, 7 out of 10 had their waitlist grow more extended, about 68%. Another factor to consider is the effect Covid has played on the counselor's health. Seeing how the pandemic has affected their patients why could it not affect the counselors if not be more sever, since they are dedicating more time to helping others instead of themselves. It has been noted that Counselors could be feeling overwhelmed, which can lead to many negative consequences. Hopefully, through research and information based upon prior crises, they can stay informed to take better care of themselves while helping others.

Professional journals 
In the United States, the scholarly journals of the profession are the Journal of Counseling Psychology and The Counseling Psychologist.

In Australia, counseling psychology articles are published in the counseling psychology section of the Australian Psychologist.

In Europe, the scholarly journals of the profession include the European Journal of Counselling Psychology (under the auspices of the European Association of Counselling Psychology) and the Counselling Psychology Review (under the auspices of the British Psychological Society). Counselling Psychology Quarterly is an international interdisciplinary publication of Routledge (part of the Taylor & Francis Group).

See also
 Clinical psychology
 Coaching psychology
 List of counseling topics
 Outline of psychology
 Professional practice of behavior analysis

References

Applied psychology